Sir M. Visvesvaraya Terminal, Bengaluru railway station (station code: SMVB)  is an Indian Railways train station located in Baiyyapanahalli, Bangalore in the Indian state of Karnataka.

Development 
The new station was constructed at a cost of ₹314 crores. The station has VIP lounges, food courts, escalators and air conditioning waiting rooms.
According to railways officials It was first air-conditioned railway terminal in South India. It was also first green field project for Indian railways to construct a world class terminal. Work was completed in the early 2021, but there is more than 18 months delay in opening of railway station. Railway officials cited the COVID-19 pandemic and lack of connectivity as the main reasons for delay, but inside sources claimed the delay was to allow the prime minister to open the station. Commercial operations began on 6 June 2022 with Ernakulam Tri-Weekly Express.

Connectivity
This railway station is connected to nearby neighborhoods in the city by BMTC buses. BMTC has deployed 10 buses on the following routes.
 MF 1E Channasandra
 MF 5 Central Silk Board
 MF 7A Subbaiahnapalya
 MF 7B Nagawara
 MF 9 Munnekolalu Cross
 412A Babusapalya to Dr B. R. Ambedkar TTMC, Domaluru (via SMVT Bengaluru) 

The buses will run 144 trips per day.

Accidents 
On 8 October 2022, A 31-year-old lady travelling with her 3-year-old child and elderly mother slipped and fell between platform no. 1 and the adjoining tracks while hurriedly boarding a moving 12551 SMVT Bengaluru–Kamakhya AC Superfast Express with a manually operated door. The lady was initially saved by an officer of the Government Railway Police, who pulled her out onto the platform. She had a fractured arm but unfortunately died while en route to the Bowring & Lady Curzon Hospitals in Shivajinagara.

References

External links 

Railway stations in Bangalore
Bangalore railway division
Railway stations opened in 2022